

Ivan Frederick II (born 1966) is an American former soldier who was court-martialed for prisoner abuse after the 2003–2004 Abu Ghraib prisoner abuse scandal. Along with other soldiers of his Army Reserve unit, the 372nd Military Police Company, Frederick was accused of allowing and inflicting sexual, physical, and psychological abuse on Iraqi detainees in Abu Ghraib prison, a notorious prison in Baghdad during the United States' occupation of Iraq. In May 2004, Frederick pleaded guilty to conspiracy, dereliction of duty, maltreatment of detainees, assault, and indecent acts. He was sentenced to 8 years' confinement and loss of rank and pay, and he received a dishonorable discharge. He was released on parole in October 2007, after spending four years in prison.

Frederick was a staff sergeant and the senior enlisted soldier at the prison from October to December 2003. Prior to his deployment to Iraq, Frederick was a corrections officer at Buckingham Correctional Center in Dillwyn, Virginia.

See also
 Charles Graner
 Lynndie England
 Jeremy Sivits
 Megan Ambuhl
 Standard Operating Procedure (film)

References

Further reading

External links
Interview with Philip Zimbardo  (scroll to 51:50)
Philip Zimbardo at TED.org

1966 births
Living people
American people convicted of assault
United States Army personnel of the Iraq War
American prison officers
People from Buckingham County, Virginia
Military personnel from Maryland
United States Army personnel who were court-martialed
United States military personnel at the Abu Ghraib prison
United States Army soldiers
Prisoners and detainees of the United States military
American people convicted of war crimes
American people convicted of torture